is a Shinto shrine located in Tenri, Nara in Japan.

The shrine became the object of Imperial patronage during the early Heian period. In 965, Emperor Murakami ordered that Imperial messengers were sent to report important events to the guardian  of Japan. These  were initially presented to 16 shrines including the Ōyamato Shrine.

The shrine was a guardian shrine of Japanese battleship Yamato.

See also 
 List of Shinto shrines
 Twenty-Two Shrines
 Modern system of ranked Shinto Shrines

References

Shinto shrines in Nara Prefecture
Kanpei-taisha
Beppyo shrines